Greg Persinger (born February 26, 1978) is an American curler. He was born in Fairbanks, Alaska. He was a member of Team USA at the 2018 World Men's Curling Championship.

At the 2020 United States Men's Championship Persinger and Team Ruohonen earned a silver medal, losing to John Shuster in the final.

Teams

Grand Slam record

References

External links

Living people
American male curlers
1978 births
Sportspeople from Fairbanks, Alaska
American curling champions